Újfehértó (Yiddish) is a small town in Szabolcs-Szatmár-Bereg County, in the Northern Great Plain region of eastern Hungary.

History
By 1920, the Jewish population had reached 1,303 people, 11% of the total population. On 17 May 1944, the 400 Jewish families living in the village were deported to Auschwitz via Nyirjes and Sima.

Twin towns – sister cities

Újfehértó is twinned with:

 Braniștea, Romania
 Cherechiu, Romania
 Doberdò del Lago, Italy
 Hut, Ukraine
 Váhovce, Slovakia
 Żarów, Poland

Notable people
András Toma (1925–2004), probably the last prisoner of war (1945–2000) from the World War II to be repatriated
Erika Marozsán (born 1972), actress
János Marozsán (born in 1965), footballer
Gábor Péter (1906–1993), Communist politician and secret police leader
Teitelbaum family of Satmar Hasidic rabbis (see Moshe Teitelbaum (Satmar))
Ferenc Zajti (1886–1961), orientalist, painter, representative of Hungarian Turanism

Gallery

See also
Teitelbaum, Satmar, Klausenberg
Nagykalló, Kalov

References

External links
Újfehértó - ShtetLink

Populated places in Szabolcs-Szatmár-Bereg County
Shtetls
Jewish communities in Hungary
Holocaust locations in Hungary
Jewish communities destroyed in the Holocaust